The TSB Bank Arena (formerly known as the Queens Wharf Events Centre) is an indoor arena in Wellington.

About

The arena hosts mainly basketball games and is the home arena for the Century City Saints and part-time home arena of the New Zealand Breakers when they play in Wellington. It was also the home arena for the Richter City Roller Derby, which started to play here in the middle of their 2009 season.

It also hosts expositions and conventions like the Armageddon Pulp Expo and the DCM Book Fair. Built in 1995, it originally held 3,635 people. In 2005, the number of seats was upgraded to 4,570 as part of a redevelopment and expansion plan. There were further plans to carry out upgrades to the Events Centre in 2007 although it is unknown if these plans went ahead.

It also operates as a music venue, but does not have ideal acoustics and professional sound treatment; for example, the retractable stadium traps all reflections (early and late) also acting as a bass trap (wanted or unwanted), thus impairing a clear sound. As a live venue, it is still able attract overseas acts.

In 2005, the annual World of Wearable Art Awards (WOW) show moved from Nelson to Wellington, to the TSB Arena.

In a feature article from 11 April 2007 edition of the Dominion Post, the Wellington Architectural Centre rated TSB Arena as Wellington's second worst building. Also in 2007 the first Māori Art Market was held in the arena before moving to the suburban Te Rauparaha Arena in Porirua City.

In July 2011 Venues Wellington (formally Positively Wellington Venues), an integration between the Wellington Convention Centre and the St James Theatre Trust, began managing the arena along with five other venues in the capital city.

Concerts

See also
 List of indoor arenas in New Zealand

References

External links

1995 establishments in New Zealand
Basketball venues in New Zealand
Defunct National Basketball League (Australia) venues
Netball venues in New Zealand
Music venues in New Zealand
Sports venues in New Zealand
Indoor arenas in New Zealand
Convention centres in New Zealand
Concert halls in New Zealand
Sports venues in Wellington City
1990s architecture in New Zealand